The Address of the 221 was an address to king Charles X of France by the chambre des députés at the opening of the French parliament on 18 March 1830.  It expressed the defiance of the chambre's liberal majority of 221 deputies to the ministry headed by Jules, prince de Polignac, and helped lead to the July Revolution.

Background

Martignac's Liberal Ministry
With the election of 17 and 24 November 1827, the liberals became the majority in the chambre des députés. Even though nothing requires that they do so and even though it is against their beliefs, they agreed to give the leadership of the ministry to the semi-liberal Viscount of Martignac. His ministry started on 4 January 1828, and although they voted into law some liberal measures, they were unable to stop the momentum of liberalism, and Martignac resigned after being outvoted on a legal reorganisation of local governments.

Replacement with Polignac's Ministry

Charles X became tired of what he considered as the abuses by the Liberals and decided to impose his own candidate to the leadership of the Ministry, despite the Liberal's parliamentary majority. On 8 August 1829, Charles X appointed Jules de Polignac, his confidant and the leader of the Ultra-royalists, as Foreign Minister. Polignac quickly emerged as the leading figure of the Ministry, and that November he finally became the Prime Minister.

Strength of the Opposition's Press
The advent of the Polignac ministry preceded the founding of the Le National newspaper, which released its first issue on 3 January 1830. In the hands of heavyweights such as Thiers, Carrel, Mignet, and Sautelet, it became the banner for liberalism. The new title was added to already well-established newspapers, such as Le Globe and Le Temps, in addition to more moderate liberal papers, such as Le Constitutionnel and the Journal des Débats.

The Address of the 221

The Debate in the Chamber
The address was elaborated by a specifically appointed parliamentary committee. The Chamber of Deputies examined it on 15 and 16 March. It was a real and proper motion of defiance against the Polignac Ministry, and, above all, a real request for the amendment of the Charter to a parliamentary system.

The Approval of the Address by a Majority of the 221 Deputies
On March 16, the Chamber of Deputies tabled the address, and among about 402 voters, it obtained 221 votes in favor and 181 votes against. The address was adopted. Immediately, Méchin, a Liberal MP very close to Louis Philippe I, ran to the Palais-Royal to bring the news to his patron, evidently already versed in everything.

Charles X's Reaction

The Reading of the Address to the Monarch

Two days later, on 18 March towards the end of the morning, Charles X received at the Tuileries the delegation of the Chamber of Deputies, led by President Royer-Collard, who read the address to the monarch as follows:

The Monarch's Response
Charles X responds:

Consequences

The crisis is in the facts and Charles X resolved to force it, while remaining formally in the wording of the Charter's limits.

 He began immediately the next day, March 17, by issuing an order which updated the session of parliamentary proceedings to 1 September. It was a move that complies with Section 50 of the Charter, which did not involve limitations, but only the protection from having to reconvene within three months: a time that Louis XVIII had decided, apparently, was enough to iron out many contrasts. What was missing, in this case, was a possible common ground between two positions, that of the liberals and the ultra-royalists, both, regardless of the respective merits, very extremist. In fact, Charles X did not come to pass to any compromise. 
Charles X attempted to follow the full path marked by the Section 50: On 16 May 1830, he dissolved the assembly, relying on the judgement of the people to rebuild a majority favourable to him. But, to his general surprise, the Liberals won the election on 23 June and 19 July, gaining 274 seats, 53 more than they had before the dissolution.
So far Charles X followed the 'constitutional' path indicated by his brother and predecessor, King Louis XVIII. But nothing had prepared him in the event that the elections did not heal the divide that the application of Section 50 was intended to do. It followed, lawfully and logically, that he must declare a winner and close the divide. But this was not the opinion of Charles X and  Polignac, who believed they are able to use Section 14 of the Charter as a last foothold: the Section 14 which specified that the king ... makes regulations and ordinance necessary for ... the security of the state. In practice, the king's actions are a right of legislative substitute, but limited to interventions for the security of the state. Furthermore, the resulting July Ordinances from 25 July were gravely injurious to the opinions of the majority of the House, and led to the July Revolution.

See also
 Charles X of France
 Louis Philippe I
 Bourbon Restoration
 Charter of 1814
 Ministry of Jules de Polignac
 July Revolution
 July Monarchy

Notes

Bibliography
Guy Antonetti, Louis-Philippe, Paris, Librairie Arthème Fayard, 2002 – 

Bourbon Restoration
July Monarchy
1830 documents